Neolucanus castanopterus is a beetle of the family Lucanidae.It is found in south and southeast Asia, including India and Thailand.

References 

Lucaninae
Beetles described in 1831